Highway 767 is a provincial highway in the Canadian province of Saskatchewan. It runs from Highway 41 near Smuts to Highway 2. Highway 767 is about 23 km (14 mi.) long.

See also 
Roads in Saskatchewan
Transportation in Saskatchewan

References 

767